Kubraki is a rural locality (a selo) and the administrative center of Kubrakovskoye Rural Settlement, Veydelevsky District, Belgorod Oblast, Russia. The population was 483 as of 2010. There are 11 streets.

Geography 
Kubraki is located 24 km east of Veydelevka (the district's administrative centre) by road. Popasny is the nearest rural locality.

References 

Rural localities in Veydelevsky District